Borre Idrettsforening is a Norwegian multi-sports club from Borre, Horten, Vestfold. It has sections for association football, team handball and gymnastics.

The men's football team plays in the 4. divisjon, the fifth tier of Norwegian football. It was formerly a staple in the 3. divisjon from 1996 to 2007.

References

Official site

Football clubs in Norway
Sport in Vestfold og Telemark
Horten
1933 establishments in Norway
Association football clubs established in 1933
Defunct athletics clubs in Norway